The House of Orsini-Rosenberg (also Ursin-Rosenberg) is the name of an old Austrian noble family. The family is mediatized and as such belongs to the high nobility. It originally sprang out from the Graben family (an apparent or illegitimate branch of the House of Meinhardin) from Castle Alt-Grabenhofen near the city of Graz.

History 
The earliest known member of the Orsini-Rosenberg family, Konrad (von Graben) ab dem Roesenperg, lived around 1322. He was a member of the low nobility who lived at Schloss Alt-Grabenhofen, between Reinerkogel and Rosenberg. During the 17th and 18th centuries, the success of the family arose from the steady accumulation of land, and loyalty to the Habsburg Emperor.

On 2 August 1633, Johann Andreas von Rosenberg, Herr von Rosenberg, was elevated to the Reichsfreiherrenstand with the title of Freiherr of the Holy Roman Empire, Freiherr of Lerchenau, Herr of Magereckh and Grafenstein, and in 1648 to the Austrian Grafenstand. Since 1681, the family held the title of Reichsgraf, and in 1683 they became members of the Reichstag. In the same year, they took the name of the old Italian princely Orsini family; their family name changed to Ursini-Rosenberg or Orsini-Rosenberg. On 9 October 1790, Franz Xaver Wolfgang von Orsini-Rosenberg was elevated to Reichsfürst von Orsini-Rosenberg.

Princes of Orsini-Rosenberg (1790) 

  Vincenz, 1st Prince 1790-1794 (1722-1794)
  Franz, 2nd Prince 1794-1832 (1761-1832)
 Ferdinand, 3rd Prince 1832-1859 (1790-1859)
  Heinrich, 4th Prince 1859-1929 (1848-1929)
  Johannes, 5th Prince 1929-1932 (1893-1932)
 Heinrich, 6th Prince 1932-2011 (1925-2011)
 Johannes, 7th Prince 2011-present (b.1949)
 Heinrich, Hereditary Prince of Orsini-Rosenberg (b.1979)
  Count Paul (b.1982)
 Count Ferdinand (b.1953)
 Count Konrad (b.1982)
  Count Ludwig (b.1989)
  Count Markus (b.1955)
  Count Maximilian (b.1988)
  Count Mathias (b.1955)
  Count Philipp (b.1998)
  Count Douglas (b.2000)
  Count Leopold (b.2004)
  Count Johann (1926-2004)
  Count Andreas (b.1954)
  Count Raphael (b.1984)
  Count Luca (b.1986)
  Count Luis (b.1988)
  Count Hubertus (b.1962)
  Count Paul (b.1999)
  Prince Friedrich (1801-1887), male heirs exist

Family members 

 Johann Andreas von Rosenberg (1600–1667), became first Count of Rosenberg.
 Vinzenz von Orsini-Rosenberg (1722–1794), Landeshauptmann of Carinthia.
 Franz Xaver Wolfgang von Orsini-Rosenberg (1726–1795), diplomat and politician, was made first Count of the Holy Roman Empire of Orsini-Rosenberg and later first Prince of the Holy Roman Empire of Orsini-Rosenberg; he was the basis for the character Count Orsini-Rosenberg in the fictional work Amadeus.
 Prince Franz Seraph of Orsini-Rosenberg (1761–1832), Austrian General of Cavalry.

See also 
 Orsini family (Italy)
 Rosenberg family (Bohemia)

Notes

Literature 
 Hans Pawlik: Orsini-Rosenberg, Geschichte und Genealogie eines alten Kärntner Adelsgeschlechts. In: Archiv für vaterländische Geschichte und Topographie. book nr. 98. Verlag des Geschichtsvereines für Kärnten, Klagenfurt 2009. p. 1-304.

External links 
 
 
 

Austrian noble families
Austrian people of Italian descent